Nkazana "Kaz" Kamwi (born 27 October 1994) is an English fashion blogger and television personality. In 2021, she was a finalist on the seventh series of Love Island and in 2022, she won the third series of Celebrity Karaoke Club.

Life and career
Kamwi was born on 27 October 1994 in Essex, England. She studied sociology at Birmingham City University before becoming a full time fashion influencer and blogger. She set up a YouTube channel in May 2017 where she began posting various different videos including make-up tutorials and vlogs.

In June 2021, Kamwi became a contestant on the seventh series of Love Island. Throughout the series, Kamwi was coupled up with Toby Aromolaran, Aaron Francis and Matthew MacNabb, however it was with Tyler Cruickshank, with whom she reached the final and finished in fourth place. They began a relationship during the series, but announced their split three months after the series had ended. Kamwi later opened up about the racist abuse she received online throughout and after appearing on the show. Kamwi and her Love Island co-stars Liberty Poole, Millie Court and Liam Reardon presented the award for Newcomer at the 26th National Television Awards. In October 2021, Kamwi appeared as a guest on the +44 Podcast with Zeze Millz and Sideman and in December, was a contestant on The Weakest Link. She also appeared as a guest on the podcast Pressed in March 2022. In June 2022, Kamwi appeared on the third series of Celebrity Karaoke Club, entering the club on Day 3. Kamwi reached the final and was voted winner of the series by her fellow contestants, making her the first late entrant to win the show. In February 2023, she competed in The Challenge UK.

Filmography

References

1994 births
Alumni of Birmingham City University
Black British television personalities
Fashion influencers
Living people
Love Island (2015 TV series) contestants
Social media influencers
Television personalities from Essex
The Challenge (TV series) contestants